Events from the year 1302 in Ireland.

Incumbent
Lord: Edward I

Events
 Alice Kyteler and her second husband, Adam le Blund, are accused of homicide. She was later the first person in Ireland to be condemned for alleged witchcraft.

Births

Deaths
 Stephen O'Braccan, Archbishop of Cashel

References

 
1300s in Ireland
Ireland